JAB code (Just Another Barcode) is a color 2D matrix symbology made of color squares arranged in either square or rectangle grids. It was developed by Fraunhofer Institute SIT (Secure Information Technology).

The code contains one primary symbol and optionally multiple secondary symbols. The primary symbol contains four finder patterns located at the corners of the symbol.

The code uses either 4 or 8 colours. The 4 basic colours (cyan, magenta, yellow, black) are the 4 primary colours of the subtractive CMYK color model which is the most widely used system in the industry for colour printing on a white base such as paper. The other 4 colours (blue, red, green, and white) are secondary colours of the CMYK model and originate as an equal mixture of a pair of basic colours.

The barcode is not subject to licensing and was submitted to ISO/IEC standardization as ISO/IEC 23634 expected to be approved at the beginning of 2021 and finalized in 2022. The software is open-source and published under the LGPL v2.1 license. The specification is freely available.

Because the colour adds a third dimension to the two-dimensional matrix, a JAB code can contain more information in the same area compared to two-colour (black and white) codes – theoretically twice as much data for a 4 colour code and three times more for 8 colours assuming the same encoding algorithm. This can allow storage of an entire message in the barcode, rather than just storing partial data with a reference to a full message somewhere else (such as a link to a website), thus eliminating the need for additional always-available infrastructure beyond the printed barcode itself. It may be used to digitally sign encrypted digital version of printed legal documents, contracts and certificates (diplomas, training), medical prescriptions or provide product authenticity assurance to increase protection against counterfeits.

References

Automatic identification and data capture
Barcodes
Encodings
Hypermedia